K49 or K-49 may refer to:

 K-49 (Kansas highway)
 Mass in G major, K. 49, by Wolfgang Amadeus Mozart
 Municipal Airport (Oklahoma), in Texas County, Oklahoma
 Potassium-49, an isotope of potassium
 Shoro Station, in Hokkaido, Japan